The Steel City Sparks was an American women's soccer team founded in 2003. The team was a member of the Women's Premier Soccer League, the third tier of women's soccer in the United States and Canada, until 2005, when the team left the league, and the franchise was terminated.

The team played its home games at Ellis Athletic Field in Pittsburgh, Pennsylvania.

The team's colors were black, gold and white.

Their first coach was Erik Ingram.

History 
The Sparks formed in 2003 to develop soccer for women in the Pittsburgh area.

Players 
The Sparks had former WUSA, W-League, and international players.

Year-by-year

References

External links
Steel City Sparks

   

Women's Premier Soccer League teams
Women's soccer clubs in the United States
Sports in Pittsburgh
Amateur soccer teams in Pennsylvania
Soccer clubs in Pennsylvania
2003 establishments in Pennsylvania
2005 disestablishments in Pennsylvania